Lasse Nielsen may refer to:

Lasse Nielsen (footballer, born 1987), Danish footballer who plays for Lyngby BK
Lasse Nielsen (footballer, born 1988), Danish footballer who plays for Malmö FF
Lasse Nielsen (canoeist) (born 1984), Danish sprint canoeist
Lasse Nielsen (filmmaker), Danish filmmaker; writer and director of Leave Us Alone, You Are Not Alone (co-writer, co-director), etc.